St. John's Missionary Baptist Church is a historic African-American Baptist church at 1130 Walt Bellamy Drive in New Bern, Craven County, North Carolina.  It was built in 1926, and is a rectangular brick church building on a raised basement in the Classical Revival style.  It features a three-stage central entrance tower.  It is believed to be the oldest black Baptist congregation in New Bern.

It was listed on the National Register of Historic Places in 1997.

References

African-American history of North Carolina
Churches completed in 1926
20th-century Baptist churches in the United States
Baptist churches in North Carolina
Churches in New Bern, North Carolina
Churches on the National Register of Historic Places in North Carolina
Neoclassical architecture in North Carolina
National Register of Historic Places in Craven County, North Carolina
Neoclassical church buildings in the United States